WDUP-LP (92.9 FM) is a Hip Hop and R&B formatted radio station that plays "Timeless" music from all eras.  The station is licensed to serve the New London, Connecticut area. The station is owned by HP-NL Communications, Inc. and was assigned the WDUP-LP call letters by the Federal Communications Commission on February 28, 2014.

References

External links

DUP
New London, Connecticut
Radio stations established in 2014
Urban contemporary radio stations in the United States
2014 establishments in Connecticut